was a village in Minamiamabe District, Ōita Prefecture, Japan.

As of 2003, the village had an estimated population of 2,765 and the density of 34.21 persons per km². The total area was 80.82 km².

On March 3, 2005, Naokawa, along with the towns of Kamae, Kamiura, Tsurumi, Ume and Yayoi, and the villages of Honjō and Yonōzu (all from Minamiamabe District), was merged into the expanded city of Saiki.

Dissolved municipalities of Ōita Prefecture